William "Smitty" Pignatelli (born August 31, 1959) is an American politician serving as a Democratic member of the Massachusetts House of Representatives, representing the 4th Berkshire District, consisting of the towns of Alford, Becket, Egremont, Great Barrington, Lee, Lenox, Monterey, Mount Washington, New Marlborough, Otis, Richmond, Sandisfield, Sheffield, Stockbridge, Tyringham, Washington and West Stockbridge, all in Berkshire County; and the towns of Blandford, Russell and Tolland, all in Hampden County. The district covers an area of 633.1 square miles. Pignatelli lives in Lenox, Massachusetts.  He ran unopposed on November 4, 2014, receiving 99.0% of the vote.  He is a member of the Joint Committees on Ways and Means and Higher Education and is vice-chair of the Committee on Tourism, Arts and Cultural Development.

See also
 2019–2020 Massachusetts legislature
 2021–2022 Massachusetts legislature

References

External links
Massachusetts House of Representatives profile

1959 births
Living people
People from Pittsfield, Massachusetts
Babson College alumni
Democratic Party members of the Massachusetts House of Representatives
21st-century American politicians
People from Lenox, Massachusetts